The 2015–16 La Liga football season (known as the Liga BBVA for sponsorship reasons) was the 85th since its establishment. Barcelona were the defending champions. It started on 21 August 2015 and concluded on 15 May 2016. Barcelona retained the title (their 24th Liga title) after beating Granada 3–0 on the final matchday. Barcelona, Real Madrid and Atlético Madrid were engaged in an intense title race, with the three teams finishing with 91, 90 and 88 points respectively.

Luis Suárez finished as top scorer, being the first player apart from Lionel Messi and Cristiano Ronaldo to do so since the 2008–09 season.

Teams

Promotion and relegation (pre-season)
A total of twenty teams contested the league, including seventeen sides from the 2014–15 season and three promoted from the 2014–15 Segunda División. This included the two top teams from the Segunda División, Real Betis and Sporting Gijón, and the winners of the play-offs, Las Palmas.

Almería and Córdoba were relegated to 2015–16 Segunda División in the previous season, after spending two and one years in La Liga, respectively. Elche was administratively relegated despite finishing in 13th. Following the competition rules, Eibar, who finished 18th, remained in the league.

Real Betis was the first team from the Segunda División to achieve promotion, after a one-year absence from La Liga, on 24 May 2015 after winning 3–0 over Alcorcón.

On 7 June 2015, Sporting Gijón secured promotion on the final matchday, after their 3–0 win against Betis allowed the club to leapfrog Girona, who drew their final match and could not retain second place and automatic promotion. Sporting returned to the top level after three years.

Las Palmas achieved promotion on 21 June 2015, after defeating Zaragoza in the promotion play-off final on away goals. Las Palmas won the second 2–0 leg at home after losing the first leg away 3–1, and returned to the first division after thirteen years away. They also became the first island team to play in La Liga since Mallorca's relegation from the top flight in the 2012–13 season. During those thirteen seasons, the club spent two of them in the third-tier Segunda División B.

Stadiums and locations

Personnel and sponsorship

1. On the back of shirt.
2. On the sleeves.
3. On the shorts.
4. Barcelona made a donation to UNICEF in order to display the charity's logo on the back of the club's kit.
5. Deportivo had a phrase in Chinese characters on the back of its shorts meaning "La Liga is Diverse".
6. Sevilla featured these sponsors only for the 2016 Copa del Rey Final.
7. Additionally, referee kits were now made by Adidas, sponsored by Würth, and Nike had a new match ball, the Ordem LFP.

Managerial changes

Overview
On 14 May 2016, Barcelona won their second consecutive and 24th overall La Liga title, following a 3–0 win over Granada at the Estadio Nuevo Los Cármenes on the final matchday. Real Madrid finished one point behind Barcelona as runners-up, having gone on a twelve-match win streak to close out the season. Atlético Madrid ended the season three points off the top in third place, having been eliminated from title contention after a loss to Levante on the penultimate matchday.

Levante were the first team to be mathematically relegated to the Segunda División, following a 1–3 loss against Málaga on 2 May 2016. On 15 May 2016, Sporting Gijón ensured they would remain in the top flight after defeating Villarreal 2–0 and taking advantage of Getafe's loss against Real Betis, which saw Getafe relegated from La Liga for the first time in club history. Rayo Vallecano also went down despite winning their final match of the season.

League table

Standings

Results

Season statistics

Scoring
First goal of the season:   Salva Sevilla for Espanyol against Getafe (22 August 2015)
Last goal of the season:   Álvaro Medrán for Getafe against Real Betis (15 May 2016)

Top goalscorers

Zamora Trophy
The Zamora Trophy was awarded by newspaper Marca to the goalkeeper with least goals-to-games ratio. A goalkeeper had to play at least 28 games of 60 or more minutes to be eligible for the trophy.

Hat-tricks

4 Player scored four goals5 Player scored five goals(H) – Home ; (A) – Away

Discipline

 Most yellow cards (club): 136
 Granada
 Most yellow cards (player): 17
 Rubén Pérez (Granada)
 Most red cards (club): 10
 Rayo Vallecano
 Most red cards (player): 2
 Aythami Artiles (Las Palmas)
 Gustavo Cabral (Celta Vigo)
 Nacho Cases (Sporting Gijón)
 Deyverson (Levante)
 Sergio Ramos (Real Madrid)
 Víctor Sánchez (Espanyol)
 Simão (Levante)

Overall
Most wins - Barcelona (29)
Fewest wins - Deportivo La Coruña and Levante (8)
Most draws - Deportivo La Coruña (18)
Fewest draws - Barcelona and Atlético Madrid (4)
Most losses - Levante (22)
Fewest losses - Real Madrid (4)
Most goals scored - Barcelona (112)
Fewest goals scored - Real Betis (34)
Most goals conceded - Espanyol (74)
Fewest goals conceded - Atlético Madrid (18)

Attendances

La Liga Awards

Seasonal

La Liga's governing body, the Liga Nacional de Fútbol Profesional, honoured the competition's best players and coach with the La Liga Awards.

Team of the Year

Monthly

Number of teams by autonomous community

Broadcasting rights
Telefónica purchased the exclusive television broadcasting rights to telecast the 2015–16 season in Spain. Sky Sports have exclusive rights in the United Kingdom and beIN Sports have exclusive rights to air the season in various countries, including the United States, Canada, MENA, France and the Middle East.  KBSN Sports have the exclusive television broadcasting rights in South Korea except internet broadcasting.

References

External links

 
2015-16
Spain
1